Hatya  is a 1988 Indian Hindi-language action thriller film directed by Kirti Kumar and starring Govinda, Neelam, Anupam Kher and Sujitha. This film is a remake of Malayalam film Poovinu Puthiya Poonthennal (1986).

Plot 
Sagar (Govinda), a wealthy but idle young man. Following a night of consuming much alcohol he finds a homeless and parentless young boy. He takes the boy home and learns that he is deaf and attempts to nurture him and names him Raja. He tries to get information out of him but does not understand anything. Raja's mother has been brutally murdered (by Surendra Mohan and his henchman Ranjeet) as she witnesses a murder committed by this pair. Sagar takes Raja out to fairs and adventures and Raja sees Ranjeet and tries to tell Sagar that he is the one who murdered his mother. Slowly Sagar understands the tale of the story. He meets a girl, Sapna (Neelam) and becomes friends. She takes them to her house. Raja sees a picture of Sapna, her father and shockingly his mother. Sagar wants to unfold the mystery of Raja's incident. He finds out that Raja's mother has been murdered. As he is looking for clues, he gets arrested. To prove his innocence the boy takes them to his house where there was a happy family. They take a sniffer dog to find out clues. The dog sniffs the floor outside the house. the men dig it and find a piece of cloth which his mother was wrapped in and buried there.

Cast 
 Govinda as Sagar
 Neelam Kothari as Sapna Nath
 Baby Sujata as Raja / Bonny
 Raj Kiran as Inspector Ashok Gupta
 Anupam Kher as Surendra Mohan
 Babu Antony as Ranjit (Surendra's henchman) 
 Johnny Lever as Lohar (pretender of Raja's father) 
 Om Shivpuri as Kailash Nath (Sapna's father) 
 Satyen Kappu as Father Joseph Sebastian (Raja's neighbour)
 Satish Kaul as Mohan (Surendra's manager)
 Aparajita as Meena (Raja's mother) 
 Lawrence D'Souza as Special Appearance
 Rakesh Bedi as Restaurant Owner
 Vikas Anand as Doctor
 Jimmy Pardhan as Jimmy

Awards 
34th Filmfare Awards:

Won

 Best Art Direction – Liladhar S. Sawant
 Best Editing – J. P. Sehgal

Soundtrack

References

External links 
 

1988 films
Hindi remakes of Malayalam films
1980s Hindi-language films
Indian action thriller films